Cerro Fábrega is a mountain in Bocas del Toro Province of western Panama. It has a height of 3,335 meters (10,942 feet).

Cerro Fábrega is the second highest point in Panama. It is located in the province of Bocas del Toro, in the border area with Costa Rica.

References

Fabrega